The Campeonato Argentino de Rugby 1963 was won by the selection of Buenos Aires that beat in the final the selection of Cordoba.

The teams were divided as in 1962, in four "zones" . The winners went to semifinals.
For discipline reason were excluded the selection of Mar del Plata and Valle de Lerma (Salta).

Rugby Union in Argentina in 1963 
 The Buenos Aires Champsionship was won by Belgrano AC
 The Cordoba Province Championship was won by Universitario and La Tablada
 The North-East Championship was won by Uni Tucuman

Preliminaries 

 Ranking: 1. Buenos Aires 2. Rio Negro y Neuquén 3. Sur

Semifinals 

  Buenos Aires : 15.J.Lassalle, 14.H.Goti, 13.J.C.Queirolo,12.M.Molina Berro, 11.E.Neri, 10.J.Haack, 9.L.Gradín, 8.D.Churchill-Browne,7.E.Scharenberg, 6.C.Álvarez, 5.C.Iribarren, 4.B.Otaño (cap.), 3.G.McCormick, 2.M.Odriozola,1.E.Verardo.
  Rosario:  15.C.Quijano, 14.E.España, 13.J.Benzi, 12.J.Orengo, 11.R.Mauro, 10.J.Ruiz, 9.O.Aletta de Sylvas (cap.), 8.W.Villar, 7.J.Imhoff, 6.M.Paván, 5.H.Ferraro, 4.M.Bouza, 3.R.Esmendi, 2.J.Benvenuto, 1.J.Gómez Kenny. 

 San Juan: 15.E.Salas, 14.R.Posleman, 13.E.Vaca, 12.H.Spollansky, 11.E.Sánchez, 10.A.Basualdo (cap.), 9.D.Bustos, 8.M.Miguel, 7.H.Cipoletto, 6.R.Rodríguez, 5.A.Echegaray, 4.F.Ferreyra, 3.N.Tula, 2.R.Oliver, 1.G.Noris
  Cordoba: 15.H.Garutti, 14.J.Astrada, 13.E.Quetglas, 12.A.Verde, 11.A.Quetglas, 10.C.Ferretti, 9.J.Ricciardello (cap.), 8.J.Ramírez Montrull, 7.J.Banus, 6.R.Loyola, 5.A.González, 4.E.Trakal, 3.J.Cocco, 2.A.Gener, 1.H.Pérez.

Final 

 Cordoba : 15.R.González del Solar, 14.L.Rodríguez, 13.J.Astrada, 12.E.Quetglas, 11.A Quetglas, 10.C.Feretti, 9.J.Ricciardello (cap.), 8.H.Banus, 7.J.Ramírez, 6.L.Loyola, 5.A.González, 4.E.Trakal, 3.H.Pérez, 2.A.Gener, 1.H.Cocco.
   Buenos Aires: 15.J.Lasalle, 14.H.Gotí, 13.J.Queirolo, 12.M.Molina-Berro, 11.E.Neri, 10.J.Haack, 9.L.Gradín, 8.M.Puigdeval, 7.D.Churchill-Browne, 6.C.Álvarez, 5.B.Otaño (cap.), 4.C.Irribarren, 3.G.Mc Cormick, 2.M. Odriozola, 1.E.Verardo.

Special Events 
Was played two special matches. The first between the "old" Buenos Aires selection of Capital and Provincia and one between a selection of Buenos Aires and another called "El resto" ("The rest")

External links 
 Memorias de la UAR 1963
 Rugby Archive

Campeonato Argentino de Rugby
Argentina
Campeonato